Albania have only qualified once for a UEFA European Championship — the 2016 edition. They directly qualified after securing the second spot in their qualifying group; this meant they would appear on a major tournament finals for the first time in their history. For the draw of the end stage that took place on 12 December 2015, they were seeded in Pot 4.

Euro 2016

Group stage

Ranking of third-placed teams

Overall record

See also

References

 
Countries at the UEFA European Championship
History of the Albania national football team